Numerical Methods for Partial Differential Equations is a bimonthly peer-reviewed scientific journal covering the development and analysis of new methods for the numerical solution of partial differential equations. It was established in 1985 and is published by John Wiley & Sons. The editors-in-chief are George F. Pinder (University of Vermont) and John R. Whiteman (Brunel University).

Abstracting and indexing
The journal is abstracted and indexed in:

According to the Journal Citation Reports, the journal has a 2020 impact factor of 3.009.

References

External links

Publications established in 1985
English-language journals
Wiley (publisher) academic journals
Bimonthly journals
Mathematics journals